Julian S. Garcia has been involved in Chicano literature since the late 1970s when the San Antonio arts and politics journal Caracol had its offices on West Commerce Street in San Antonio, Texas. In 1985, Garcia became one of Caracol associate editors. He was also an Associate editor of ViAztlan, an international journal of ideas and philosophy. A deconstructionist with a penchant for Aristotelian logic and a mentor to Tejano writers, Garcia has a written articles and editorials under a nom-de-plume.

Early life and education 
Garcia graduated from Our Lady of the Lake College in San Antonio with a Bachelor of Arts degree in Sociology and Bilingual Education. He earned a master's degree in Bicultural-Bilingual Studies from the University of Texas at San Antonio in 1977. He then studied English literature at Southwest Texas State University.

Career 
Garcia is best known for his short stories in Caracol (which ran from 1974-1979), ViAztlan, and Saguaro.

As a short story writer and essayist, Garcia won the Caracol Fiction Prize, in 1979, with the publication of Las Manos (June 23, 1979).  In 1984, the article, Writing through Suffering won another prize in ViAztlan Vol. 2, No. 7 (April, 1984).  In 1985, the publication of his essay, The New Age of Chicano Music was included in a special edition of ViAztlan, No. 3., No. 2.  His story, Don Cheno's Icehouse subsequently appeared in ViAztlan (March, 1985).

Poet Alurista published Garcia's The Harvest in the 1986 edition of Southwest Tales: A Contemporary Collection (Colorado State: Maize Press). In 1986 the University of Arizona published his story, El Viaje in its biannual journal, Saguaro.

After a ten-year hiatus, Garcia got back into fiction and published La Fantastica Curandera in Puentes (Texas A & M University-Corpus Christi, ed. Jesus Rosales).

References

Other Publications
Rosales, Jesus. Puentes: Revista Mexico-Chicana de Literatura, cultural y arte. No.4., Otono, 2006.
Paz, Edward. J. "Julian S. Garcia", Dictionario de Escritores Chicanos, DF: Mexico. 2010.

Writers from San Antonio
Living people
University of Texas at San Antonio alumni
Texas State University alumni
Our Lady of the Lake University alumni
Tejano writers
Year of birth missing (living people)